Afroploce karsholti is a species of moth of the family Tortricidae. It is found in the Democratic Republic of Congo, Ghana, Kenya, Malawi, Mozambique, Nigeria, South Africa and Tanzania.

References

Moths described in 2004
Olethreutini
Moths of Africa